FNST may stand for:

 Femoral nerve stretch test, a neurological procedure
 Fédération Nationale des Syndicats de Transports or Transport Federation, French trade union
Friedrich-Naumann-Stiftung für die Freiheit, German foundation